Max Mirnyi and Sandon Stolle were the defending champions but they competed with different partners that year, Mirnyi with Roger Federer and Stolle with Joshua Eagle.

Eagle and Stolle lost in the final 6–4, 7–6(7–0) against Federer and Mirnyi.

Seeds

Draw

External links
 2002 Kremlin Cup Men's Doubles Draw

Kremlin Cup
Kremlin Cup